Subic may refer to:
 Šubić family, a noble clan from Dalmatia
 Subic Bay, a bay in the Philippines
 U.S. Naval Base Subic Bay, former United States naval base
 Subic Special Economic and Freeport Zone, an economic free trade area located in the former U.S. naval base
 Subic Bay International Airport, located on the airstrip of the former U.S. naval base
 Subic, Zambales, a municipality in the Philippines located on the bay